Ješenca is a settlement in the Municipality of Rače–Fram in northeastern Slovenia. The area is part of the traditional region of Styria. The municipality is now included in the Drava Statistical Region.

References

External links
 Ješenca at Geopedia

Populated places in the Municipality of Rače-Fram